Crash and Burn is a 2008 American television action crime thriller film directed by Russell Mulcahy and written by Frank Hannah and Jack LoGiudice. It stars Erik Palladino, Michael Madsen, and Heather Marie Marsden, and premiered on Spike TV on March 30, 2008.

Plot 

Kevin Hawkins, a former car thief now working as an undercover cop, hooks up with his old small-time crime buddies in order to infiltrate a warring gang of choppers who'll do anything to secure their territory. When a brutal murder adds a violent twist to Kevin's mission, he fears it's all headed for a violent crash and burn.

Cast
 Erik Palladino as Kevin Hawkins
 Michael Madsen as Vincent Scaillo
 David Moscow as Hill Dorset 
 Heather Marie Marsden as Penny Middleton
 Peter Jason as Winston Manny
 Owen Beckman as Benny Dorset Tommy

References

External links

2008 television films
2008 films
2008 action thriller films
2008 crime thriller films
2000s English-language films
Action television films
American action thriller films
American crime action films
American crime thriller films
American thriller television films
Crime television films
Films about automobiles
Films directed by Russell Mulcahy
Films scored by Jeff Rona
Spike (TV network) original programming
2000s American films